is the 18th studio album by Japanese rock band Buck-Tick, released on September 19, 2012. It is their first on their own record label Lingua Sounda, which was founded the previous year. The album reached the number 14 position on the Oricon chart and number 12 on Billboard Japan, selling 19,807 copies.

The album's cover art is based on Austrian painter Gustav Klimt's Gold Fish. The limited edition version of Yume Miru Uchuu has a different cover based on the painting and came with a DVD of footage from the band's June 10, 2012 concert at Hibiya Open-Air Concert Hall. It also contained the promotional video for "Climax Together", which was filmed on August 5 at Shinjuku Loft in front of 300 fans. Fans who bought both of the album's singles, "Miss Take ~Boku wa Miss Take~" and "Elise no Tame ni", were chosen by lottery to win tickets to the video shoot.

Track listing

Personnel
Buck-Tick
 Atsushi Sakurai – vocals
 Hisashi Imai – guitar, noise, chorus
 Hidehiko Hoshino – guitar, chorus
 Yutaka Higuchi – bass
 Toll Yagami – drums

Additional performers
 Kazutoshi Yokoyama – manipulator, synthesizer on tracks 1–3 & 6–11
 Cube Juice – manipulator, synthesizer on tracks 4 & 5
 Tabu Zombie (Soil & "Pimp" Sessions) – trumpet, brass arrangement on track 6
 Motoharu (Soil & "Pimp" Sessions) – tenor saxophone, brass arrangement on track 6
 Kenichi Fukushima – baritone saxophone on track 6

References

2012 albums
Buck-Tick albums
Japanese-language albums